The Royal Borough of Kensington and Chelsea is an Inner London borough with royal status. It is the smallest borough in London and the second smallest district in England; it is one of the most densely populated administrative regions in the United Kingdom. It includes affluent areas such as Notting Hill, Kensington, South Kensington, Chelsea, and Knightsbridge.

The borough is immediately west of the City of Westminster and east of the London Borough of Hammersmith and Fulham. It contains major museums and universities in Albertopolis, department stores such as Harrods, Peter Jones and Harvey Nichols, and embassies in Belgravia, Knightsbridge and Kensington Gardens. The borough is home to the Notting Hill Carnival, Europe's largest, and contains many of the most expensive residential properties in the world, as well as Kensington Palace, a British royal residence.

The local authority is Kensington and Chelsea London Borough Council.

History
The borough was formed by the merger of the Royal Borough of Kensington and the Metropolitan Borough of Chelsea, under the London Government Act 1963, which reorganised 86 boroughs and urban districts into 32 London boroughs on 1 April 1965 together with the creation of the Greater London Council.

The new borough was originally intended to be called only "Kensington", but after protests from thousands of Chelsea residents, the then Minister of Housing and Local Government, Sir Keith Joseph, announced on 2 January 1964 that the name of the new borough would be the Royal Borough of Kensington and Chelsea.

Of its history the council states: "Despite the boroughs being separate originally, Kensington and Chelsea still retain their unique characters. Even the amalgamation of the two boroughs, unpopular as it was at the time, has been accepted. Today conservation combined with the adoption of sympathetic new architecture is seen as a key objective. In every corner of the borough signs of its history can be seen: from Grade 1 listed buildings Kensington Palace and the Royal Hospital, Chelsea to others recalled in street names such as Pottery Lane and Hippodrome Mews."

In 200 years the area has been transformed from a "rural idyll" to a thriving part of the modern metropolis. Chelsea had originally been countryside upon which Thomas More built Beaufort House. He came to Chelsea in 1520 and built the house, which in his day had two courtyards laid out between the house and the river, and in the north of the site acres of gardens and orchards were planted. It was from here in 1535 that More was taken to the Tower and beheaded later that year. This area of Cheyne Walk continued its historic significance; nearby Crosby Hall sits on the river near the Church of Thomas More, and what was once Thomas Carlyle's residence remains on Cheyne Row.

Kensington's royal borough status was granted in 1901 as it was the home of Kensington Palace, where Queen Victoria was born in 1819 and lived until her accession in 1837. Commissioned by King William III, Christopher Wren enlarged and rebuilt the original house in 1689, turning it into a fitting royal residence. With the King came many court officials, servants and followers. Kensington Square, until then a failing venture, became a popular residential area. The Palace was regularly used by reigning monarchs until 1760 and since then by members of the Royal family. Kensington's royal borough status was inherited by the new borough.

In the 19th century, the last emperor of the Sikh Empire, Maharaja Duleep Singh who was brought to England as a child following the Second Anglo-Sikh War, along with the Koh-i-noor diamond, lived in the borough at 53 Holland Park, while his mother Maharani Jind Kaur (wife of Maharaja Ranjit Singh) lived at the nearby Abingdon House till her death in 1846.

During the Second World War, civilians suffered great hardship; there were some 800 deaths and 40,000 injuries. A huge army of civilian volunteers was raised, including Auxiliary Fire Service, Red Cross, Air Raid Wardens and Rescue Services. During the Blitz much damage was caused by explosive and incendiary bombs, especially along Chelsea's riverside. But worse was to come in 1944 with the arrival of the V2 rockets, or flying bombs. Among the buildings either destroyed or seriously damaged, usually with terrible loss of life, were Chelsea Old Church, Church of Our Most Holy Redeemer, Our Lady of Victories, St Mary Abbots, St Stephens Hospital, St Mary Abbots Hospital, Sloane Square tube station, World's End, the Royal Hospital and Holland House.

Kensington and Chelsea is perhaps best known today for two events that demonstrate both their traditional and modern aspects. The Chelsea Flower Show, held in the grounds of the Royal Hospital every May, is attended by Royalty and the "cream of society"; and the Notting Hill Carnival, held every August Bank Holiday on the streets of North Kensington, has grown over the past 30 years from a small community-based event into Europe's biggest and most exuberant street party, attracting a million plus visitors.

Districts
The borough may be split into the following districts; these differ from the council's electoral wards:
 Albertopolis
 Bayswater (also partly in the City of Westminster)
 Belgravia (also partly in the City of Westminster)
 Brompton
 Chelsea
 Chelsea Harbour (also partly in the London Borough of Hammersmith and Fulham)
 Earl's Court
 Holland Park
 Kensal Green (also partly in Brent)
 Kensington
 Knightsbridge (also partly in the City of Westminster)
 Ladbroke Grove
 North Kensington
 Notting Hill
 South Kensington
 West Brompton
 West Kensington (also partly in the London Borough of Hammersmith and Fulham)
 World's End

See also Kensington and Chelsea parks and open spaces

Demographics

At the 2011 census, the borough had a population of 158,649 who were 71% White, 10% Asian, 5% of multiple ethnic groups, 4% Black African and 3% Black Caribbean. It is the least populated of the 32 London boroughs. Due to its high French population it has long held the unofficial title of the 21st arrondissement of Paris.

In 2005, the borough had more of its land covered by domestic buildings than anywhere else in England at 19%, over half the national average. It also had the fifth highest proportion of land covered by non-domestic buildings at 12%.

As of 2010, statistics released by the Office for National Statistics showed that life expectancy at birth for females was 89.8 years in 2008–2010, the highest in the United Kingdom. Male life expectancy at birth for the same period was 85.1 years. The figures in 1991–1993 were significantly lower: 73.0 years for males (ranking 301st in the nation) and 80.0 for females (ranking 129th). Further investigation indicates a 12-year gap in life expectancy between the affluent wards of Chelsea (Royal Hospital, Hans Town) and the most northerly wards of North Kensington (Golborne, Dalgarno), which have high levels of social housing and poverty.

The borough has a higher proportion (16.6%) of high earners (over £60,000 per year) than any other local government district in the country. It has the highest proportion of workers in the financial sector and the lowest proportion working in the retail sector.

In December 2006, Sport England published a survey which showed that the borough's residents were the fourth most active in England in sports and other fitness activities. 27.9% of the population participate at least three times a week for 30 minutes.

A 2017 study by Trust for London and the New Policy Institute found that Kensington & Chelsea has the greatest income inequality of any London Borough. Private rent for low earners was also found to be the least affordable in London. However, the borough's poverty rate of 28% is roughly in line with the London-wide average.

The following table shows the ethnic group of respondents in the 2001 and 2011 census in Kensington and Chelsea.

Ethnicity

Politics

As of 2018, the council has 36 Conservative, 13 Labour and 1 Liberal Democrat councillors. The first past the post electoral system is used. The Labour or Liberal councillors have tended to represent the economically diverse areas of the borough; some marginal wards are concentrated towards the north, where north Kensington meets Kilburn, Kensal Rise/Green and Ladbroke Grove. Wealthy white areas, including all the wards in Holland Park, (parts of) Notting Hill, Kensington, South Kensington, and Chelsea, have been safe Conservative seats since the council's creation in 1965.

The borough has combined a number of services and departments with its neighbours, Hammersmith & Fulham and Westminster City Council.

The borough is divided between two constituencies represented in the House of Commons of the Parliament of the United Kingdom:

 Kensington, held by Felicity Buchan for the Conservative Party, and
 Chelsea and Fulham (partly in Hammersmith & Fulham), held by Greg Hands for the Conservative Party.

At the 2005 General Election, the borough was divided differently:
 Kensington and Chelsea, held by Sir Malcolm Rifkind for the Conservative Party, and
 Regent's Park and Kensington North (partly in City of Westminster), held by Karen Buck for the Labour Party.

Rifkind held the Kensington seat until the 2015 General Election when he stood down after becoming embroiled in a scandal, uncovered by a television investigation, over accepting money in return for access to influential British diplomats and politicians.

Three of the more notable council leaders were Nicholas Freeman, from 1977 until 1989, Sir Merrick Cockell who held the position from 2000 to 2013., and Elizabeth Campbell, from 2017 in the wake of the Grenfell Tower Tragedy to the present day.

Transport

Underground

The borough has 12 tube stations, on five of the 11 London Underground lines:
 Central line
 Circle line
 District line
 Hammersmith & City line
 Piccadilly line

with stations at South Kensington, Gloucester Road, High Street Kensington, Earl's Court, Sloane Square, West Brompton, Notting Hill Gate, Holland Park, Latimer Road, Knightsbridge, Westbourne Park and Ladbroke Grove.

Crossrail

Chelsea (SW3, SW10 and partly SW1) has significantly less Underground access than Kensington, the only station within Chelsea being Sloane Square. There have for some time been long-term plans for a Chelsea-Hackney line, with a station in the King's Road near Chelsea Town Hall, and possibly another at Sloane Square.  As of June 2019, the plans for Crossrail 2 materialising show the proposed route tunnelling through Chelsea and featuring a station on the site of Dovehouse Green.   The future of this station, being the only fully new station on the proposed line, remains ambiguous; initial scrapping of the station idea  have been decried by withstanding placement of the station on official Transport for London information on the route.

A Crossrail station on the original Crossrail route, from Paddington to Reading, has been proposed and endorsed by the council.  This station would be located near the northern end of Ladbroke Grove, and would serve the areas of North Kensington and Kensal.  The council supports this station concept as it would renew infrastructure and build regeneration benefits in the area.

National Rail and Overground

Paddington and Victoria are the nearest major railway termini; National Rail stations in the borough are Kensington (Olympia) and West Brompton (and partly Kensal Green), both served by London Overground and Southern.

Buses

Many London bus routes pass through the borough, most of them along King's Road, Fulham Road, Kensington High Street and Ladbroke Grove.

Cycling

Kensington and Chelsea council has been criticised for its lack of support for cycle lanes and active travel in general. In 2019 the council vetoed a flagship programme by TfL for safer walking and cycling in the borough. In 2020 it scrapped a cycle lane along Kensington High Street just seven weeks after it was installed.

Travel to work

In March 2011, the main forms of transport that residents used to travel to work were: underground, metro, light rail, tram, 23.6% of all residents aged 16–74; driving a car or van, 8.2%; on foot, 8.2%; bus, minibus or coach, 8.0%; work mainly at or from home, 7.0%; bicycle, 3.1%; train, 2.1%.

Social housing and Grenfell tower fire

The RBKC is a major provider of social housing in the borough owning 9,459 properties. Of these over 73% are tenanted, with the remainder being leasehold. The management of this housing was devolved to the Kensington and Chelsea TMO (KCTMO), a tenant management organisation. Properties included Trellick Tower.

The 2017 Grenfell Tower fire, in which a public-housing tower block was completely destroyed, with the loss of 72 lives, drew international attention to the borough. After widespread criticism of the borough council's response to the fire, responsibility for providing services to those affected by the fire was taken away from RBKC. Prime Minister Theresa May previously branded the response to the tragedy "not good enough", with Whitehall civil servants drafted in as part of a beefed-up operation in the local area.
Prof Anna Stec who gave evidence as an expert witness to the Grenfell Tower Inquiry has urged the authorities to test rescue workers, nearby residents and survivors for carcinogenic chemicals following the fire.

Religion

The following shows the religious identity of residents residing in Kensington and Chelsea according to the 2001, 2011 and the 2021 censuses.

Places of worship

The borough has a number of notable churches, including:
 Brompton Oratory – Roman Catholic
 Chelsea Old Church (All Saints) – Church of England
 Holy Trinity Brompton – Church of England
 St Columba's Church, Pont Street – Church of Scotland
 St Luke's Church, Chelsea, Sydney Street – Church of England
 St Mary Abbots – Church of England
 St Sophia's Cathedral – Greek Orthodox Church
 Kensington Temple – Elim Pentecostal Church

It is home to a small Spanish and Portuguese synagogue, several mosques and the Sikh Central Gurudwara in Holland Park. There are two Armenian churches - Saint Sarkis Armenian Church and Church of Saint Yeghiche. Westminster Synagogue is also partially located in the borough.

Diplomatic Missions 
The borough's notable districts are home to numerous international diplomatic missions:

High Commissions
  Bangladesh
  Cameroon
  Cyprus (residency)
  Dominica
  Fiji
  Gambia
  Mauritius
  Pakistan
  Saint Vincent and the Grenadines
  Zambia

Embassies

  Armenia
  Belarus
  Denmark
  Ecuador
  Estonia
  Gabon
  Greece
  Guatemala
  Iraq
  Israel
  Jordan
  Lebanon
  Mongolia
  Morocco
  Nepal
  The Netherlands
  Paraguay
  Peru
  The Philippines (Trade office)
  Romania
  Russian Federation
  Slovakia
  Thailand
  Ukraine
  Uzbekistan
  Venezuela
  Vietnam
  Yemen

Featured places

Within the borough there are several of London's tourist attractions and landmarks:

 Brompton Oratory
 Earl's Court
 Harrods
 Hill House School
 Imperial College
 Jumeirah Carlton Tower
 Kensington Arcade
 Kensington High Street
 Kensington Palace
 King's Road
 Ladbroke Grove
 Leighton House Museum
 Notting Hill Gate
 Olympia (part)
 Portobello Road
 Royal Albert Hall
 Royal Hospital Chelsea
 Saatchi Gallery
 Sloane Street
 The Science Museum and Natural History Museum
 Victoria & Albert Museum

Education

Schools

The council's education department finances state schools.

London's Poverty Profile - a 2017 study by Trust for London and the New Policy Institute - found that 75% of 19-year-olds in Kensington and Chelsea have at least a C in their GCSE English and Maths. This is the highest success rate in London.

Independent preparatory schools
Hill House School, whose notable alumni including King Charles III and actress Anya Taylor-Joy. 
Sussex House School

Further education
 Kensington and Chelsea College
 St Charles Catholic Sixth Form College

Universities
 English National Ballet School- in the heart of Chelsea
 Royal College of Art – the main campus is in South Kensington, with the sculpture department in Battersea.
 Royal College of Music
 Imperial College London – the main campus is in South Kensington.
 Heythrop College – a Constituent College of the University of London specialising in Theology & Philosophy
 Richmond, The American International University in London – the secondary campus is in Kensington.
 Fordham University - maintains a campus through a partnership with Heythrop College

Public libraries
Libraries include the Kensington Central Library, Chelsea Library, Kensal Library, Brompton Library, North Kensington Library and the Notting Hill Gate Library.

International relations

Town twinning

The Royal Borough of Kensington and Chelsea is formally twinned with:
  Cannes, Alpes-Maritimes, Provence-Alpes-Côte d'Azur, France

Freedom of the Borough
The following people and military units have received the Freedom of Royal Borough of Kensington and Chelsea.

Individuals
 Rt Hon Sir Winston Churchill : 1949. (Borough of Kensington)

Military Units
 The Army Phantom Signal Regiment: 6 October 1959. (Borough of Kensington)
 The Royal Hospital Chelsea: 28 June 2006.
 31 (City of London) Signal Regiment (V)
 Kensington Regiment (Princess Louise's) Signal Squadron 38 Signal Regiment
 D Company (London Irish Rifles) The London Regiment
 10 Company 4th Battalion, Parachute Regiment 
 21 Special Air Services Regiment (Artists Rifles) (V)
 256 (City of London) Field Hospital (V)
 The Royal Yeomanry
 The University of London Air Squadron  (V)
 University of London Royal Naval Unit

See also

 Tri-borough shared services

References

External links
 
 
 Kensington & Chelsea Council
 Kensington & Chelsea Local Involvement Network (K&C LINk)

 
Kensington and Chelsea
Kensington and Chelsea
1965 establishments in the United Kingdom
Places with royal patronage in London